The NASA Standard Initiator (NSI) is a pyrotechnic device used to set off other pyrotechnic devices.
It is the central multi-purpose component of a modular system of detonating cords, pyrotechnics and various other explosive charges with many different uses.

The ignition charge of the device is a blend of zirconium, potassium perchlorate, Viton B and graphite.

Uses of the device include:

 Setting off pressure cartridges, pocket sized gas generators which in turn pneumatically activate other systems.
 Setting off the NASA standard detonator, which itself activates other systems explosively.
 Triggering Pyrotechnic Circuit Interrupters, severing bundles of electrical cables
 Triggering explosive valves to open/close pressurization lines or fuel lines.
 Acting as an igniter

Development

The NASA Standard Initiator (NSI) was developed from the Single-Bridgewire Apollo Standard Initiator (SBASI) which was itself based on the Apollo Standard Initiator (ASI).

To provide additional redundancy and thus make the spacecraft more relieable, a double-bridgewire design was utilized, but during development of the Apollo Standard Initiator it was found that the original design responded unfavorably to RF frequencies. This resulted in a re-design with a single bridgewire which was approved in 1966. This new design introduced several other changes to improve resistance and give the device a longer shelf life, such as switching the Material of the body from 17-4 PH steel to Inconel 718.After the Apollo program ended, the Initiator was renamed and re-used on other spacecraft, such as the Space Shuttle.

References

See also

 NASA standard detonator

Pyrotechnic initiators
Spacecraft pyrotechnics